Arambegama may refer to:

 Arambegama (7°16'N 80°32'E), a village in Sri Lanka
 Arambegama (7°20'N 80°34'E), a village in Sri Lanka